Koester L. "Keddy" Christensen (April 28, 1905 – May 16, 1946) was an American football player.  He played college football for Michigan State College (later known as Michigan State University). He also played professional football in the National Football League for the Portsmouth Spartans during the 1926 season. After his football career ended, Christensen returned to his home town of Escanaba, Michigan, where he worked as a commercial fisherman. During World War II, he served aboard a submarine chaser and other ships in the United States Navy, attaining the rank of lieutenant.  He died of a heart attack at his home in Escanaba in 1946 at age 41.

References

1905 births
1946 deaths
People from Escanaba, Michigan
Michigan State Spartans football players
Portsmouth Spartans players
Players of American football from Michigan
United States Navy officers
United States Navy personnel of World War II
American fishers
Military personnel from Michigan